"Grace and Beauty" is a classic rag composed by James Scott and published by John Stillwell Stark in 1909.

The A section starts out with a rising melody that slowly descends through repeated patterns. Like many of Scott's rags, the C and D sections contain the echo device reminiscent of the ring shout spirituals of the 19th century, while the B section uses a melodic variation of this device.

References

External links 
  Sheet music of Grace and Beauty at Wikisource

1909 songs
Rags
Compositions for solo piano
Songs with music by James Scott (composer)